Bata is a port city in the Litoral province of  Equatorial Guinea. With a 2005 estimated population of 173,046, it is the largest city in Equatorial Guinea. It lies on the Atlantic Ocean coast of Río Muni. Bata was formerly capital of Equatorial Guinea and is a transport hub and port, from which ferries sail to Malabo and Douala, while aircraft can land at Bata Airport. Bata is also known for its nightlife and market.

History
After the anti-Spanish riots of 1969, the European population declined in Bata, and severe economic stagnation affected Bata in the 1970s and early 1980s. The oil boom of the country in the late 1980s and 1990s has boosted the development of the city.

On 7 March 2021, the city was struck by a series of explosions which resulted in the death of at least 105 people and the wounding of more than 615 others. The majority of the buildings in the city were damaged by the explosions.

Economy 
Bata has one of the deepest seaports in the region. Despite this, Bata has no natural harbor and a jetty was built to facilitate offshore handling of ships' cargoes. The principal exports are timber and coffee. The port was expanded in part by Chinese cooperation loans, and its capacity is 6,5 million tonnes and 300,000 TEUs annually.

Climate 
Bata, like most of Equatorial Guinea, has a tropical monsoon climate (Köppen Am). It is much less gloomy than Malabo, and has its dry season in the opposite months to insular Equatorial Guinea but in the same months as neighbouring Gabon due to the Benguela Current. There is also a minor depression in rainfall between December and February when the Intertropical Convergence Zone is at its most southerly, and unlike the true dry season in July and August, this is accompanied by increased sunshine.

Education
The Colegio Nacional Enrique Nvó Okenve has campuses here and in Malabo.

The Colegio Español, a Spanish international school, is the city's sole international school.

Places of worship  
Among the places of worship, they are predominantly Christian churches and temples (Catholic: Roman Catholic Diocese of Bata, Protestant, Evangelical Christian: Assemblies of God).

Transport
Bata Airport is located north of Bata.

Notable people
 Regina Mañe Ela (1954–2015), politician and opposition campaigner
 José Machín, Equatorial Guinean professional footballer

References

External links
 

 
Populated places in Litoral (Equatorial Guinea)